The Denisovans or Denisova hominins  ) are an extinct species or subspecies of archaic human that ranged across Asia during the Lower and Middle Paleolithic. Denisovans are known from few physical remains; consequently, most of what is known about them comes from DNA evidence. No formal species name has been established pending more complete fossil material.

The first identification of a Denisovan individual occurred in 2010, based on mitochondrial DNA (mtDNA) extracted from a juvenile female finger bone excavated from the Siberian Denisova Cave in the Altai Mountains in 2008. Nuclear DNA indicates close affinities with Neanderthals. The cave was also periodically inhabited by Neanderthals, but it is unclear whether Neanderthals and Denisovans ever cohabited in the cave. Additional specimens from Denisova Cave were subsequently identified, as was a single specimen from the Baishiya Karst Cave on the Tibetan Plateau, and Cobra Cave in the Annamite Mountains of Laos. DNA evidence suggests they had dark skin, eyes, and hair, and had a Neanderthal-like build and facial features. However, they had larger molars which are reminiscent of Middle to Late Pleistocene archaic humans and australopithecines.

Denisovans apparently interbred with modern humans, with the highest percentages (roughly 5%) occurring in Melanesians, Aboriginal Australians, and Filipino Negritos. This distribution suggests that there were Denisovan populations across Eurasia, the Philippines, and New Guinea and/or Australia, but this is unconfirmable. Introgression into modern humans may have occurred as recently as 30,000 years ago in New Guinea, which, if correct, might indicate this population persisted as late as 14,500 years ago. There is also evidence of interbreeding with the Altai Neanderthal population, with about 17% of the Denisovan genome from Denisova Cave deriving from them. A first-generation hybrid nicknamed "Denny" was discovered with a Denisovan father and a Neanderthal mother. Additionally, 4% of the Denisovan genome comes from an unknown archaic human species which diverged from modern humans over one million years ago.

Taxonomy 
Denisovans may represent a new species of Homo or an archaic subspecies of Homo sapiens (modern humans), but there are too few fossils to erect a proper taxon. Proactively proposed species names for Denisovans are H. denisova or H. altaiensis.

Discovery 

Denisova Cave is in south-central Siberia, Russia, in the Altai Mountains near the border with Kazakhstan, China and Mongolia. It is named after Denis (Dyonisiy), a Russian hermit who lived there in the 18th century. The cave was first inspected for fossils in the 1970s by Russian paleontologist Nikolai Ovodov, who was looking for remains of canids.

In 2008, Michael Shunkov from the Russian Academy of Sciences and other Russian archaeologists from the Institute of Archaeology and Ethnography of the Siberian Branch of the Russian Academy of Sciences in Novosibirsk Akademgorodok investigated the cave and found the finger bone of a juvenile female hominin originally dated to 50–30,000 years ago. The estimate has changed to 76,200–51,600 years ago. The specimen was originally named X-woman because matrilineal mitochondrial DNA (mtDNA) extracted from the bone demonstrated it to belong to a novel ancient hominin, genetically distinct both from contemporary modern humans and from Neanderthals.

In 2019, Greek archaeologist Katerina Douka and colleagues radiocarbon dated specimens from Denisova Cave, and estimated that Denisova 2 (the oldest specimen) lived 195,000–122,700 years ago. Older Denisovan DNA collected from sediments in the East Chamber dates to 217,000 years ago. Based on artifacts also discovered in the cave, hominin occupation (most likely by Denisovans) began 287±41 or 203±14 ka. Neanderthals were also present 193±12 ka and 97±11 ka, possibly concurrently with Denisovans.

Specimens 

The fossils of five distinct Denisovan individuals from Denisova Cave have been identified through their ancient DNA (aDNA): Denisova 2, 3, 4, 8, and 11. An mtDNA-based phylogenetic analysis of these individuals suggests that Denisova 2 is the oldest, followed by Denisova 8, while Denisova 3 and Denisova 4 were roughly contemporaneous. During DNA sequencing, a low proportion of the Denisova 2, Denisova 4 and Denisova 8 genomes were found to have survived, but a high proportion of the Denisova 3 genome was intact. The Denisova 3 sample was cut into two, and the initial DNA sequencing of one fragment was later independently confirmed by sequencing the mtDNA from the second.

These specimens remained the only known examples of Denisovans until 2019, when a research group led by Fahu Chen, Dongju Zhang and Jean-Jacques Hublin described a partial mandible discovered in 1980 by a Buddhist monk in the Baishiya Karst Cave on the Tibetan Plateau in China. Known as the Xiahe mandible, the fossil became part of the collection of Lanzhou University, where it remained unstudied until 2010. It was determined by ancient protein analysis to contain collagen that by sequence was found to have close affiliation to that of the Denisovans from Denisova Cave, while uranium decay dating of the carbonate crust enshrouding the specimen indicated it was more than 160,000 years old. The identity of this population was later confirmed through study of environmental DNA, which found Denisovan mtDNA in sediment layers ranging in date from 100,000 to 60,000 years before present, and perhaps more recent.

In 2018, a team of Laotian, French, and American anthropologists, who had been excavating caves in the Laotian jungle of the Annamite Mountains since 2008, was directed by local children to the site Tam Ngu Hao 2 ("Cobra Cave") where they recovered a human tooth. The tooth (catalogue number TNH2-1) developmentally matches a 3.5 to 8.5 year old, and a lack of amelogenin (a protein on the Y chromosome) suggests it belonged to a girl barring extreme degradation of the protein over a long period of time. Dental proteome analysis was inconclusive for this specimen, but the team found it anatomically comparable with the Xiahe mandible, and so tentatively categorized it as a Denisovan, although they could not rule out it being Neanderthal. The tooth probably dates to 164,000 to 131,000 years ago.

Some older findings may or may not belong to the Denisovan line, but Asia is not well mapped in regards to human evolution. Such findings include the Dali skull, the Xujiayao hominin, Maba Man, the Jinniushan hominin, and the Narmada hominin. The Xiahe mandible shows morphological similarities to some later East Asian fossils such as Penghu 1, but also to Chinese H. erectus. In 2021, Chinese palaeoanthropologist Qiang Ji suggested his newly erected species, H. longi, may represent the Denisovans based on the similarity between the type specimen's molar and that of the Xiahe mandible.

Evolution 

Sequenced mitochondrial DNA (mtDNA), preserved by the cool climate of the cave (average temperature is at freezing point), was extracted from Denisova 3 by a team of scientists led by Johannes Krause and Svante Pääbo from the Max Planck Institute for Evolutionary Anthropology in Leipzig, Germany. Denisova 3's mtDNA differs from that of modern humans by 385 bases (nucleotides) out of approximately 16,500, whereas the difference between modern humans and Neanderthals is around 202 bases. In comparison, the difference between chimpanzees and modern humans is approximately 1,462 mtDNA base pairs. This suggested that Denisovan mtDNA diverged from that of modern humans and Neanderthals about 1,313,500–779,300 years ago; whereas modern human and Neanderthal mtDNA diverged 618,000–321,200 years ago. Krause and colleagues then concluded that Denisovans were the descendants of an earlier migration of H. erectus out of Africa, completely distinct from modern humans and Neanderthals.

However, according to the nuclear DNA (nDNA) of Denisova 3—which had an unusual degree of DNA preservation with only low-level contamination—Denisovans and Neanderthals were more closely related to each other than they were to modern humans. Using the percent distance from human–chimpanzee last common ancestor, Denisovans/Neanderthals split from modern humans about 804,000 years ago, and from each other 640,000 years ago. Using  nucleotide site per year, it is 616,000 years ago. Using the latter dates, the split had likely already occurred by the time hominins spread out across Europe. H. heidelbergensis is typically considered to have been the direct ancestor of Denisovans and Neanderthals, and sometimes also modern humans. Due to the strong divergence in dental anatomy, they may have split before characteristic Neanderthal dentition evolved about 300,000 years ago.

The more divergent Denisovan mtDNA has been interpreted as evidence of admixture between Denisovans and an unknown archaic human population, possibly a relict H. erectus or H. erectus-like population about 53,000 years ago. Alternatively, divergent mtDNA could have also resulted from the persistence of an ancient mtDNA lineage which only went extinct in modern humans and Neanderthals through genetic drift. Modern humans contributed mtDNA to the Neanderthal lineage, but not to the Denisovan mitochondrial genomes yet sequenced. The mtDNA sequence from the femur of a 400,000-year-old H. heidelbergensis from the Sima de los Huesos Cave in Spain was found to be related to those of Neanderthals and Denisovans, but closer to Denisovans, and the authors posited that this mtDNA represents an archaic sequence which was subsequently lost in Neanderthals due to replacement by a modern-human-related sequence.

Demographics 

Denisovans are known to have lived in Siberia, Tibet, and Laos. The Xiahe mandible is the earliest recorded human presence on the Tibetan Plateau. Though their remains have been identified in only these three locations, traces of Denisovan DNA in modern humans suggest they ranged across East Asia, and potentially western Eurasia. In 2019, geneticist Guy Jacobs and colleagues identified three distinct populations of Denisovans responsible for the introgression into modern populations now native to, respectively: Siberia and East Asia; New Guinea and nearby islands; and Oceania and, to a lesser extent, across Asia. Using coalescent modeling, the Denisova Cave Denisovans split from the second population about 283,000 years ago; and from the third population about 363,000 years ago. This indicates that there was considerable reproductive isolation between Denisovan populations.

Based on the high percentages of Denisovan DNA in modern Papuans and Australians, Denisovans may have crossed the Wallace Line into these regions (with little back-migration west), the first human species to do so. By this logic, they may have also entered the Philippines, living alongside H. luzonensis which, if this is the case, may represent the same or a closely related species. These Denisovans may have needed to cross large bodies of water. Icelanders also have an anomalously high Denisovan heritage, which could have stemmed from a Denisovan population far west of the Altai mountains. Genetic data suggests Neanderthals were frequently making long crossings between Europe and the Altai mountains especially towards the date of their extinction.

Using exponential distribution analysis on haplotype lengths, Jacobs calculated introgression into modern humans occurred about 29,900 years ago with the Denisovan population ancestral to New Guineans; and 45,700 years ago with the population ancestral to both New Guineans and Oceanians. Such a late date for the New Guinean group could indicate Denisovan survival as late as 14,500 years ago, which would make them the latest surviving archaic human species. A third wave appears to have introgressed into East Asia, but there is not enough DNA evidence to pinpoint a solid timeframe.

The mtDNA from Denisova 4 bore a high similarity to that of Denisova 3, indicating that they belonged to the same population. The genetic diversity among the Denisovans from Denisova Cave is on the lower range of what is seen in modern humans, and is comparable to that of Neanderthals. However, it is possible that the inhabitants of Denisova Cave were more or less reproductively isolated from other Denisovans, and that, across their entire range, Denisovan genetic diversity may have been much higher.

Denisova Cave, over time of inhabitance, continually swung from a fairly warm and moderately humid pine and birch forest to tundra or forest-tundra landscape. Conversely, Baishiya Karst Cave is situated at a high elevation, an area characterized by low temperature, low oxygen, and poor resource availability. Colonization of high-altitude regions, due to such harsh conditions, was previously assumed to have only been accomplished by modern humans. Denisovans seem to have also inhabited the jungles of Southeast Asia. The Tam Ngu Hao 2 site may have been a closed forest environment.

Anatomy 
Little is known of the precise anatomical features of the Denisovans since the only physical remains discovered so far are a finger bone, four teeth, long bone fragments, a partial jawbone, and a parietal bone skull fragment. The finger bone is within the modern human range of variation for women, which is in contrast to the large, robust molars which are more similar to those of Middle to Late Pleistocene archaic humans. The third molar is outside the range of any Homo species except H. habilis and H. rudolfensis, and is more like those of australopithecines. The second molar is larger than those of modern humans and Neanderthals, and is more similar to those of H. erectus and H. habilis. Like Neanderthals, the mandible had a gap behind the molars, and the front teeth were flattened; but Denisovans lacked a high mandibular body, and the mandibular symphysis at the midline of the jaw was more receding. The parietal is reminiscent of that of H. erectus.

A facial reconstruction has been generated by comparing methylation at individual genetic loci associated with facial structure. This analysis suggested that Denisovans, much like Neanderthals, had a long, broad, and projecting face; large nose; sloping forehead; protruding jaw; elongated and flattened skull; and wide chest and hips. The Denisovan tooth row was longer than that of Neanderthals and anatomically modern humans.

Middle-to-Late Pleistocene East Asian archaic human skullcaps typically share features with Neanderthals. The skullcaps from Xuchang feature prominent brow ridges like Neanderthals, though the nuchal and angular tori near the base of the skull are either reduced or absent, and the back of the skull is rounded off like in early modern humans. Xuchang 1 had a large brain volume of approximately 1800 cc, on the high end for Neanderthals and early modern humans, and well beyond the present-day human average.

The Denisovan genome from Denisova Cave has variants of genes which, in modern humans, are associated with dark skin, brown hair, and brown eyes. The Denisovan genome also contains a variant region around the EPAS1 gene that in Tibetans assists with adaptation to low oxygen levels at high elevation, and in a region containing the WARS2 and TBX15 loci which affect body-fat distribution in the Inuit. In Papuans, introgressed Neanderthal alleles are highest in frequency in genes expressed in the brain, whereas Denisovan alleles have highest frequency in genes expressed in bones and other tissue.

Culture

Denisova Cave 

Early Middle Paleolithic stone tools from Denisova Cave were characterized by discoidal (disk-like) cores and Kombewa cores, but Levallois cores and flakes were also present. There were scrapers, denticulate tools, and notched tools, deposited about 287±41 thousand years ago in the Main Chamber of the cave; and about 269±97 thousand years ago in the South Chamber; up to 170±19 thousand and 187±14 thousand years ago in the Main and East Chambers, respectively.

Middle Paleolithic assemblages were dominated by flat, discoidal, and Levallois cores, and there were some isolated sub-prismatic cores. There were predominantly side scrapers (a scraper with only the sides used to scrape), but also notched-denticulate tools, end-scrapers (a scraper with only the ends used to scrape), burins, chisel-like tools, and truncated flakes. These dated to 156±15 thousand years ago in the Main Chamber, 58±6 thousand years ago in the East Chamber, and 136±26–47±8 thousand years ago in the South Chamber.

Early Upper Paleolithic artefacts date to 44±5 thousand years ago in the Main Chamber, 63±6 thousand years ago in the East Chamber, and 47±8 thousand years ago in the South Chamber, though some layers of the East Chamber seem to have been disturbed. There was blade production and Levallois production, but scrapers were again predominant. A well-developed, Upper Paleolithic stone bladelet technology distinct from the previous scrapers began accumulating in the Main Chamber around 36±4 thousand years ago.

In the Upper Paleolithic layers, there were also several bone tools and ornaments: a marble ring, an ivory ring, an ivory pendant, a red deer tooth pendant, an elk tooth pendant, a chloritolite bracelet, and a bone needle. However, Denisovans are only confirmed to have inhabited the cave until 55 ka; the dating of Upper Paleolithic artefacts overlaps with modern human migration into Siberia (though there are no occurrences in the Altai region); and the DNA of the only specimen in the cave dating to the time interval (Denisova 14) is too degraded to confirm species identity, so the attribution of these artefacts is unclear.

Tibet 
In 1998, five child hand- and footprint impressions were discovered in a travertine unit near the Quesang hot springs in Tibet, which in 2021 were dated to 226 to 169 thousand years ago using uranium decay dating. This is the oldest evidence of human occupation of the Tibetan Plateau, and given the Xiahe mandible is the oldest human fossil from the region (albeit, younger than the Quesang impressions), these may have been made by Denisovan children. The impressions were printed onto a small panel of space, and there is a little overlap between all the prints, so they seem to have been taking care to make new imprints in unused space. If considered art, they are the oldest known examples of rock art. Similar hand stencils and impressions do not appear again in the archeological record until roughly 40,000 years ago.

The footprints comprise four right impressions and one left superimposed on one of the rights. They were probably left by two individuals. The tracks of the individual who superimposed their left onto their right may have scrunched up their toes and wiggled them in the mud, or dug their finger into the toe prints. There are two sets of handprints (from a left and right hand), which may have been created by an older child unless one of the former two individuals had long fingers. The handprints average , which roughly equates with a 12 year old modern human child, and the middle finger length agrees with a 17 year old modern human. One of the handprints shows an impression of the forearm, and the individual was wiggling their thumb through the mud.

Interbreeding 

Analyses of the modern human genomes indicate past interbreeding with at least two groups of archaic humans, Neanderthals and Denisovans, and that such interbreeding events occurred on multiple occasions. Comparisons of the Denisovan, Neanderthal, and modern human genomes have revealed evidence of a complex web of interbreeding among these lineages.

Archaic humans 
As much as 17% of the Denisovan genome from Denisova Cave represents DNA from the local Neanderthal population. Denisova 11 was an F1 (first generation) Denisovan/Neanderthal hybrid; the fact that such an individual was found may indicate interbreeding was a common occurrence here. The Denisovan genome shares more derived alleles with the Altai Neanderthal genome from Siberia than with the Vindija Cave Neanderthal genome from Croatia or the Mezmaiskaya cave Neanderthal genome from the Caucasus, suggesting that the gene flow came from a population that was more closely related to the local Altai Neanderthals. However, Denny's Denisovan father had the typical Altai Neanderthal introgression, while her Neanderthal mother represented a population more closely related to Vindija Neanderthals.

About 4% of the Denisovan genome derives from an unidentified archaic hominin, perhaps the source of the anomalous ancient mtDNA, indicating this species diverged from Neanderthals and humans over a million years ago. The only identified Homo species of Late Pleistocene Asia are H. erectus and H. heidelbergensis, though in 2021, specimens allocated to the latter species were reclassified as H. longi and H. daliensis.

Before splitting from Neanderthals, their ancestors ("Neandersovans") migrating out of Africa into Europe apparently interbred with an unidentified "superarchaic" human species who were already present there; these superarchaics were the descendants of a very early migration out of Africa around 1.9 mya.

Modern humans 
A 2011 study found that Denisovan DNA is prevalent in Aboriginal Australians, Near Oceanians, Polynesians, Fijians, Eastern Indonesians and Mamanwans (from the Philippines); but not in East Asians, western Indonesians, Jahai people (from Malaysia) or Onge (from the Andaman Islands). This means that Denisovan introgression occurred within the Pacific region rather than on the Asian mainland, and that ancestors of the latter groups were not present in Southeast Asia at the time, which in turn means that eastern Asia was settled by modern humans in two distinct migrations. In the Melanesian genome, about 4–6% or 1.9–3.4% derives from Denisovan introgression. It was reported that New Guineans and Australian Aborigines have the most introgressed DNA, but Australians have less than New Guineans, until a 2021 study discovered 30 to 40% more Denisovan ancestry in Filipino Negritos than in Papuans, by their estimates roughly 5% of the genome. They recorded the highest levels in the Aeta genome. In Papuans, less Denisovan ancestry is seen in the X chromosome than autosomes, and some autosomes (such as chromosome 11) also have less Denisovan ancestry, which could indicate hybrid incompatibility. The former observation could also be explained by less female Denisovan introgression into modern humans, or more female modern human immigrants who diluted Denisovan X chromosome ancestry.

In contrast, 0.2% derives from Denisovan ancestry in mainland Asians and Native Americans. South Asians were found to have levels of Denisovan admixture similar to that seen in East Asians. The discovery of the 40,000-year-old Chinese modern human Tianyuan Man lacking Denisovan DNA significantly different from the levels in modern-day East Asians discounts the hypothesis that immigrating modern humans simply diluted Denisovan ancestry whereas Melanesians lived in reproductive isolation. A 2018 study of Han Chinese, Japanese, and Dai genomes showed that modern East Asians have DNA from two different Denisovan populations: one similar to the Denisovan DNA found in Papuan genomes, and a second that is closer to the Denisovan genome from Denisova Cave. This could indicate two separate introgression events involving two different Denisovan populations. In South Asian genomes, DNA only came from the same single Denisovan introgression seen in Papuans. A 2019 study found a third wave of Denisovans which introgressed into East Asians. Introgression, also, may not have immediately occurred when modern humans immigrated into the region.

The timing of introgression into Oceanian populations likely occurred after Eurasians and Oceanians split roughly 58,000 years ago, and before Papuan and Aboriginal Australians split from each other roughly 37,000 years ago. Given the present day distribution of Denisovan DNA, this may have taken place in Wallacea, though the discovery of a 7,200 year old Toalean girl (closely related to Papuans and Aboriginal Australians) from Sulawesi carrying Denisovan DNA makes Sundaland another potential candidate. Other early Sunda hunter gatherers so far sequenced carry very little Denisovan DNA, which either means the introgression event did not take place in Sundaland, or Denisovan ancestry was diluted with gene flow from the mainland Asian Hòabìnhian culture and subsequent Neolithic cultures.

In other regions of the world, archaic introgression into humans stems from a group of Neanderthals related to those which inhabited Vindija Cave, Croatia, as opposed to archaics related to Siberian Neanderthals and Denisovans. However, about 3.3% of the archaic DNA in the modern Icelandic genome descends from the Denisovans, and such a high percentage could indicate a western Eurasian population of Denisovans which introgressed into either Vindija-related Neanderthals or immigrating modern humans.

Denisovan genes may have helped early modern humans migrating out of Africa to acclimatize. Although not present in the sequenced Denisovan genome, the distribution pattern and divergence of HLA-B*73 from other HLA alleles (involved in the immune system's natural killer cell receptors) has led to the suggestion that it introgressed from Denisovans into modern humans in West Asia. In a 2011 study, half of the HLA alleles of modern Eurasians were shown to represent archaic HLA haplotypes, and were inferred to be of Denisovan or Neanderthal origin. A haplotype of EPAS1 in modern Tibetans, which allows them to live at high elevations in a low-oxygen environment, likely came from Denisovans. Genes related to phospholipid transporters (which are involved in fat metabolism) and to trace amine-associated receptors (involved in smelling) are more active in people with more Denisovan ancestry. Denisovan genes may have conferred a degree of immunity against the G614 mutation of SARS-CoV-2.

See also

References

Further reading

External links 
 
 The Denisova Consortium's raw sequence data and alignments
 Human Timeline (Interactive) – Smithsonian, National Museum of Natural History (August 2016).
 Picture of Denisovan molar.

Homo fossils
Human populations
Altai Krai
Prehistoric Asia
Paleolithic